O. celebensis may refer to:

Occidozyga celebensis, the Sulawesian puddle frog, a frog species
Oreophryne celebensis, a frog species
Orientozeuzera celebensis, a moth species
Oryzias celebensis, a fish species